The Hundred of Bray, is a hundred in the County of Robe within the Limestone Coast region of South Australia.

The main geographic feature of the hundred is Lake Hawden.

References

Limestone Coast
Bray